Leon Perera (born 1970) is a Singaporean politician. A member of the opposition Workers' Party (WP), he has been the Member of Parliament (MP) representing the Serangoon division of Aljunied GRC since 2020.

Education
Perera was educated at the Anglo-Chinese School and Hwa Chong Junior College before graduating from Exeter College, Oxford at the University of Oxford with a Bachelor of Arts with double first class honours (later promoted to Master of Arts by seniority) degree in philosophy, politics and economics (PPE).

Career
Outside politics, Perera began his career as a senior officer at the Economic Development Board's International Business Development Division, serving first in the policy planning function supporting Singapore's regional investments. He later served as Assistant Head in the Enterprise Development Division, assisting in the growth of large Singaporean companies in the service sector, from logistics, education and healthcare to information technology services, engineering and retail.

Perera was the co-founder and chief executive officer of Spire Research and Consulting, an international business research and consulting agency. He is also a member of the Economic Society of Singapore, the Economic Development Board Society and the Singapore Institute of Directors.

Political career 

Before running as a candidate, Perera was a Workers' Party grassroots activist in the Paya Lebar ward of Aljunied GRC.

During the 2015 general election, Perera contested in a four-member team of the Worker's Party team in East Coast GRC. His team received 39.27% of the votes cast, with the governing People's Action Party garnering 60.73% of votes to win the GRC. The Workers' Party team was the best performing opposition team, so one of the team members was eligible to take up a Non-constituency Member of Parliament (NCMP) seat. The Workers' Party thus nominated Perera to be a NCMP in the 13th Parliament.

NCMP term 
Following the Hepatitis C outbreak at Singapore General Hospital in October 2015 which led to the deaths of five patients, Perera called on the government to convene a Committee of Inquiry to help "restore confidence" in Singapore's public health institutions. He also requested that the names of Singapore General Hospital and Ministry of Health staff responsible for the outbreak be released, and questioned what penalties or warnings were imposed on these staff.

In 2018, Perera apologised to Parliament and withdrew an inaccurate example given in the House in response to a question of parliamentary footage access the previous year.

MP term 
Perera joined the five-member Workers' Party team contesting in Aljunied GRC during the 2020 general election and they won with 59.95% of the vote, so Perera became an elected Member of Parliament representing the Serangoon ward of Aljunied GRC in the 14th Parliament.

Perera is the Media Team Head of the Workers' Party.

Policies and Views 

Perera's maiden speech as elected MP called for social safety nets to be strengthened, widened, and made easier to access. He highlighted the need to respect the role of civil society and for the government to be less resistant to a more plural political landscape, so as to foster a more antifragile society. He also called for greater support for entrepreneurs.

In 2021, Perera raised a motion on gender equality with Sengkang MP He Ting Ru.

In the same year, Perera filed an adjournment motion on hawker policy reform.

Perera also frequently focuses on public accountability issues in his speeches. In 2019, he participated in the debate on the Protection from Online Falsehoods and Manipulation Act (POFMA), highlighting how the proposed tool "is a cure worse than the disease" as too much power is given to individual Ministers. Additionally, he highlighted the potential for the law to stifle free speech. The law was eventually passed on 8 May 2019.

During the debate on the Foreign Interference (Countermeasures) Act 2021, he moved amendments he argued were needed to boost transparency and tackle the likelihood of elite capture resulting from the powers granted by the bill.

On healthcare, Perera raised an adjournment motion on preventive health reform in 2022, responding to Singapore's poor track record on chronic diseases such as diabetes, by calling on the Government to adopt a highly-targeted, outcome-based approach with regular reviews. Other proposals were to nudge target groups through subsidies and leverage the large amount of data available to flag health issues out to patients at visits to the doctor.

On climate change and the environment, Perera raised an adjournment motion in 2016 calling on the Government to boost support for new industries with non-economic benefits, including renewable energy and environmental technology.

During the 2022 debate on the Carbon Pricing (Amendment) Bill, Perera and He Ting Ru also filed amendments to the bill placing limitations on how allowances may be granted to taxable facilities, as well as the introduction of a registry requiring Ministers to disclose decisions to grant allowances and the use of international carbon credits.

Personal life
Perera is married with a daughter and a son.

He was active in civil society before joining party politics. He served on the committee of local human rights organisation Maruah, was the Vice President of migrant worker rights organisation HOME, and was an adviser to alternative news website The Independent.

References

External links
 Leon Perera on Parliament of Singapore
 
 

Workers' Party (Singapore) politicians
Anglo-Chinese School alumni
Hwa Chong Junior College alumni
Members of the Parliament of Singapore
1970 births
Living people
Singaporean Non-constituency Members of Parliament